Tommie James Frazier Jr. (born July 16, 1974) is an American former football player and coach who played quarterback for the University of Nebraska–Lincoln.

Frazier led his team to consecutive national championships in 1994 and 1995, and is one of six quarterbacks to have done so since the 1950s: Oklahoma's Steve Davis, Nebraska's Jerry Tagge, USC's Matt Leinart, Alabama's A. J. McCarron and Georgia's Stetson Bennett being the others. He was named Most Valuable Player of three consecutive national championship games, the only player ever to accomplish that feat.  The 1995 Nebraska football team is considered to have been one of the most dominant in the history of American college football and, in a 2006 ESPN.com poll, was voted the best college football team of all time.

Frazier was selected by Sports Illustrated in 1999 as a back-up quarterback in their "NCAA Football All-Century Team." He was one of six Nebraska Cornhuskers on this 85 man roster, along with Johnny Rodgers, Rich Glover, Dave Rimington, Dean Steinkuhler and Aaron Taylor. CollegeFootballNews.com named Frazier in 2004 as the #33 player on their Top 100 Greatest College Football Players of All-Time list. In 2013, Frazier was elected to the college football hall of fame.

Frazier was not drafted by the NFL due to a blood clot in his left leg, a side effect of Crohn's disease.

Personal life
Frazier grew up in Palmetto, Florida, and attended Manatee High School.  He was an option quarterback at Manatee High School who in his final two seasons ran for 1,600 yards and 33 touchdowns, and passed for 2,600 yards and 30 touchdowns. Frazier is married to the Andrea (Stephens) Frazier, originally from Sioux Falls, South Dakota.  The couple has a son named Tommie James Frazier III, and a daughter named Ava.

Frazier is a member of Iota Phi Theta fraternity. He is host of the recently launched Tommie Frazier's X's and O's (on TouchdownTommie.com) and of The Husker Express Radio Show with Tommie Frazier, which airs on ESPN 590 AM in Omaha, Nebraska.

Collegiate playing career

1992 season
Frazier received an athletic scholarship to attend the University of Nebraska at Lincoln, and played for the Nebraska Cornhuskers football team.  After several years in which the Cornhuskers had suffered blowout losses in bowl games, frequently in Orange Bowl matchups against the University of Miami Hurricanes and the Florida State Seminoles, head coach Tom Osborne changed his recruiting strategy in the early 1990s and began to recruit faster players at all positions.  Osborne reportedly shed tears upon receiving the news of Frazier's decision to accept a scholarship from Nebraska.  Frazier, rated as the No. 3 college recruit in the country by analyst Tom Lemming, led Nebraska to four consecutive New Year's Day bowl games.

Tommie Frazier joined the Nebraska football team as an 18-year-old true freshman in the summer of 1992, at 6-1 and 190 pounds, and began as a backup to senior Mike Grant. Nebraska started the season with a 4-1 record under Grant, but an early 29-14 loss to the second-ranked Washington Huskies set up Frazier's opportunity to take over as the starting quarterback. He did so at Missouri on October 24, a  34-24 Nebraska victory. Frazier gained national recognition with the following two games, both blowout wins broadcast nationally in evening time slots on ESPN. He led the team on Halloween to a 52-7 win against a powerful Colorado team that carried a 9-1-1 record and was led by quarterback Kordell Stewart. Frazier threw sparingly, completing 4 of 12 passes for 55 yards and two touchdowns, but rushed 16 times for 86 of Nebraska's 373 rushing yards. Frazier's arm was showcased the following week, November 7, in a 49-7 win over Kansas. Play-action fakes resulted in long touchdown passes of 36 and 46 yards, and Frazier finished the game with 6 of 11 passes completed, for 161 yards and three touchdowns.

Nebraska finished the season with a 9-3 record, and Frazier registered seven starts at quarterback. He played well in the FedEx Orange Bowl on January 1, 1993 against an 11-1 Florida State team led by quarterback Charlie Ward, wide receiver Tamarick Vanover, and linebacker Marvin Jones. Florida State took an early 20-0 lead, but Frazier, who started the game in a shotgun formation, responded with a 41-yard touchdown pass to Corey Dixon and a red zone touchdown pass to Gerald Armstrong. The Seminoles won the game, 27-14.

Frazier played in nine games during the 1992 regular season, and completed 44 of 100 passes for 727 yards and only one interception. He rushed for 399 yards, and scored 17 touchdowns, rushing and passing. His longest run was 52 yards, against Iowa State on November 14.

1993 season
Frazier helped the Cornhuskers to edge past UCLA on September 18 in what appeared to be a pivotal win that season. He completed 13-of-19 passes for 145 yards and an 11-yard touchdown pass in a 14-13 victory over the Bruins, who had the Pac-10's top pass defense. This enabled Nebraska to achieve an undefeated record during the regular season in 1993. Frazier rushed for over 1,000 yards through the regular- and post-season, though the official total is lower due to negative yardage from sacks. He rushed for nine touchdowns, with a longest run of 58 yards, and completed 77 of 162 passes for 12 touchdowns, four interceptions and 1,159 yards in 11 games. His longest pass play of the season was a 60-yard touchdown to wingback Corey Dixon  on October 30 against the Colorado Buffaloes.

The FedEx Orange Bowl game played on January 1, 1994 featured a rematch between Nebraska and Florida State. Frazier, now a sophomore, was pitted against newly crowned Heisman Trophy winner Charlie Ward. A last minute drive by Ward led to a Seminoles field goal that prevented the Cornhuskers from winning the national title. Frazier's 29-yard pass to split end Trumaine Bell positioned Nebraska for a potentially game-winning 45-yard field goal attempt with 0:01 left on the game clock, but the kick sailed wide left, and Florida State won 18-16. Frazier was named Most Valuable Player of the national title game despite the loss, completing 13 of 24 passes for 206 yards and a 34-yard touchdown, and rushing 14 times for 77 yards with a 32-yard run. The Cornhuskers finished the season with an 11-1 record.

1994 season
Frazier earned consideration as a Heisman Trophy candidate in the first half of the 1994 season, but missed the second half due to a blood clot in his leg. He gave an explosive performance against West Virginia on August 28, in which he completed 8 of 16 passes for 100 yards and ran 12 times for 130 yards, and scored on an 11-yard touchdown pass and runs of 25, 27, and 42 yards in a 31-0 Nebraska victory. His last game of the regular season was on September 24, when he began to experience difficulties in his right calf as the result of blood clotting.  Nebraska beat Pacific 70-21, but Frazier played sparingly, and attempted only two passes, with one 26-yard completion.

Dropback passer Brook Berringer led the team back to the FedEx Orange Bowl with a 12-0 record, where the Cornhuskers faced the third-ranked Miami Hurricanes in a national championship game. Frazier started the game, but was replaced by Berringer after a deep, end zone throw on Nebraska's initial drive resulted in a turnover.  The Hurricanes gained the momentum, and led by 17-7 early in the 3rd quarter. With seven minutes left in the game and the team trailing 17-9, Osborne placed Frazier back in the lineup.  Frazier led two touchdown drives that gave Nebraska a 24–17 victory. Nebraska's option plays tired the Miami defenders, and Frazier's fake of the option play enabled fullback Cory Schlesinger to score on 15 and 14 yard runs. The Cornhuskers celebrated their first national title since 1971, and the first of coach Osborne's career.  Frazier was again named MVP, as despite the three-month layoff he completed 3 of 5 passes for 25 yards, and ran seven times for 31 yards, including a 25-yard option keeper.

1995 season
Frazier was back to health in 1995, and led the Cornhuskers through another undefeated campaign.  He had a strong arm, though not a particularly accurate one, but by his senior year had improved his passing to the point that he completed 56.4 percent of his passes and had an efficiency rating of 156.1, along with 17 touchdowns. His best passing performance of the season came in a 44-21 victory over Colorado on October 28, in which he had 14 completions in 23 attempts against a 10-2 Colorado Buffaloes team. He threw for 241 yards and two scores in that game, including a 52-yard touchdown to wingback Clester Johnson.  This performance put Frazier into consideration for the Heisman Trophy, though he would finish the season as the runner-up to Ohio State's  Eddie George in Heisman voting.

The 1995 roster matched Frazier with a number of running backs that included Lawrence Phillips, Ahman Green, Clinton Childs, Damon Benning, Joel Makovicka, and Jay Sims, to form a backfield that set an NCAA record 7.0 yards per rushing attempt.  The Cornhuskers averaged 399.8 rushing yards and 52.4 points per game.  In the regular season, Frazier completed 92 of 163 passes for 1,362 yards and four interceptions, rushed 97 times for 604 yards and 14 touchdowns, and was never sacked. His longest pass play went 76 yards to split end Reggie Baul, against Oklahoma State on August 31.

Nebraska finished the regular season with an 11-0 record, and were matched with the 12-0 Florida Gators in the Tostitos Fiesta Bowl on January 2, 1996. Frazier collected his third consecutive national championship game MVP award as the Cornhuskers defeated Florida's "Fun 'n' Gun" offense by a score of 62-24. He rushed 16 times for 199 yards, and completed 6 of 14 passes for 105 yards, with a 16-yard TD pass to Phillips. On what appeared to be a routine short-yardage option sweep to the right sideline in the closing seconds of the 3rd quarter, Frazier kept the ball, turned upfield, and broke seven tackles in a career-high 75-yard touchdown run that was named by Sports Illustrated as one of college football's greatest plays.

Legacy
Frazier's place in the University of Nebraska's football history is firmly secured after helping the Cornhuskers win national and conference championships—and going 45-4 with 5,476 total yards of offense and 79 touchdowns.  With his jersey number being retired in 1996, he was listed as one of the greatest college football players of the century according to Sport Magazine.

Sports Illustrated's Tim Layden, who covered Frazier in the Tostitos Fiesta Bowl, discussed his leadership and toughness following Nebraska's 62-24 dismantling of the Florida Gators.  "On that memorable 75-yard touchdown run, Frazier broke seven tackles and dragged two Florida defenders several yards before shaking free and rolling down the sideline alone," Layden elaborated.  "And after playing brilliantly in both Nebraska's  18-16 Orange Bowl loss to Florida State in 1994 and the Cornhuskers' 24-17 national-title victory over Miami last season, he must now be considered one of the best big-game quarterbacks in college football history—it’s Tommie Fraizer."

Also, there was a kind, gentle, and humble side to Frazier that spectators were able to witness late that night as CBS' reporter Michele Tafoya handed him the microphone during the postgame celebration following the Tostitos Fiesta Bowl.  "Oh listen, I had a great career at Nebraska," Frazier said as this gave the Floridian the opportunity to open up with gratitude, giving back to the Cornhusker fan base. "There is no better way to end it; I want to thank all the fans for all the support, and I want to thank all my teammates—most of all important, I want to thank the Lord Jesus Christ above, because without him, I wouldn't have been able to accomplish anything I have."

On May 7, 2013, Tommie Frazier was elected to the College Football Hall of Fame.  Frazier became eligible in 2006, and despite his many accomplishments on the field, it took 7 years for the committee to vote him into the Hall of Fame.

Professional playing career
Frazier won the MVP award for his 34–18 victory in the East-West Shrine Game, nationally televised on ESPN on January 13, 1996. West Coach Terry Donahue said there was no doubt that Frazier's performance had improved his standing in regards to the NFL draft.  "I think he came here with all kinds of doubts...this game really helped him and somebody is going to invest in him. I am really high on him.  When I did the Fiesta Bowl, I said the guy was the most dangerous player in college football and I mean it more now. This guy's dangerous. He's great."  Frazier completed 11 of 20 passes for 163 yards, rushed six times for 33 yards, scored on a five-yard run, and threw a 52-yard touchdown pass to Kevin Jordan with 5:57 left in the contest.

The East-West Shrine Game showcased Frazier's skill set for the many NFL scouts in attendance, but before the NFL Scouting Combine, he experienced more problems with blood clots. Recruiting analyst Forrest Davis' publication had listed Frazier's speed in the 40-yard dash as 4.50 seconds when he came out of high school, and his test results at Nebraska had been similar. However, Frazier's February 1996 performance at the NFL Scouting Combine was described as "pedestrian" by the February 12, 1996, The Atlanta Journal-Constitution. Due primarily to health issues, Frazier went unselected in the NFL Draft, but received an offer from the Montreal Alouettes of the Canadian Football League. He signed a contract with the Alouettes on July 15, 1996, and served as the third-string quarterback behind starter Tracy Ham and top reserve Jim Kemp.  Frazier played in only one game, on August 30, 1996, a 17–6 loss to the Ottawa Rough Riders in which he came off the bench in the 4th quarter and completed 6 of 17 passes for 55 yards.

Frazier's brief professional football career ended when, on September 4, 1996, he was admitted to Montreal General Hospital with pneumonia. He was given blood thinners because of his history of clots, but spat blood. Frazier needed two weeks to recover, and on his September 17 release, retired from football.

Coaching career
Frazier served as an assistant football coach at Baylor University, and as an assistant director of athletic development at Nebraska.  At Baylor, Frazier joined head coach Kevin Steele's coaching staff as a graduate assistant, and worked with the quarterbacks in 1999.  He was promoted to a full-time position, and coached Baylor's running backs from 2000 to 2002. Steele failed to improve on Baylor's losing record, and the coaching staff was let go after going 3–9 in 2002. Baylor went 9–36 while Frazier was as an assistant coach for the Bears.

In 2005, Frazier became the 32nd head football coach at Doane College, in Crete, Nebraska, and held that position for two seasons.

Head coaching record

Records and statistics
 33–3 record as starter
 2 national championships
 4 Big Eight Conference championships
 former Nebraska Cornhuskers record for total offense, career (5,476 yards)
 former Nebraska Cornhuskers record for touchdown passes, career (43)
 former Nebraska Cornhuskers record for rushing touchdowns by a quarterback, season (14)
 former NCAA record for rushing yards in a bowl game by a quarterback (199)
 former Nebraska Cornhuskers record for total offense in a bowl game (304 yards)
 longest touchdown run in a bowl game (75 yards)

Notes - Statistics from the wikitable include bowl game performances.

Additional accolades
 Football Writers 1995 First Team All American
 Walter Camp 1995 First Team All American
 Associated Press 1995 First Team All American
 United Press International 1995 First Team All American
 AFCA 1995 First Team All American
 Sporting News Offensive Player of the Year (1995)
 TD Club of Columbus Quarterback of the Year (1995)
 Sport magazine Top 10 Players of the Century
 Heisman Trophy Runner-Up (1995)
 ESPY's College Football Play of the Year (1996)

References

Further reading
 Athlon Football - Nebraska & the Big Eight - 1992 Edition, Volume 16 (magazine)
 Athlon Football - Nebraska & the Big Eight - 1993 Edition, Volume 17 (magazine)
 Athlon Football - Nebraska & the Big Eight - 1994 Edition, Volume 18 (magazine)
 Athlon Football - Nebraska & the Big Eight - 1995 Edition, Volume 19 (magazine)
 Atlanta Journal Constitution - "Scouts seek next Slash; Just a QB, Frazier says", edition of February 12, 1996 (newspaper)
 VHS recording of CBS Tostitos Fiesta Bowl, January 1, 1996
 Lindy's Big Eight Football Annual / 1992, Volume 6 (magazine)
 Bob Schaller's "Touchdown Tommie - The Tommie Frazier Story"
 Sports Illustrated Presents - College Football '95 - Premier Edition (magazine)
 Phil Steele's 1995 College Football Preview, Volume 1 (magazine)
 Strong Arm Tactics: A History and Statistical Analysis of the Professional Quarterback
 Tommie Frazier -- HuskerMax
 USA Today - "East-West Shrine Game" (box score), January 13, 1996 (newspaper)
 The Washington Post - "Frazier Shows Off Arm for Scouts", January 14, 1996 (newspaper)

External links

 

1974 births
Living people
American football quarterbacks
Baylor Bears football coaches
Doane Tigers football coaches
Montreal Alouettes players
Nebraska Cornhuskers football players
All-American college football players
College Football Hall of Fame inductees
Sportspeople from Bradenton, Florida
Players of American football from Florida
African-American coaches of American football
African-American players of American football
African-American players of Canadian football
People from Palmetto, Florida
People with Crohn's disease
21st-century African-American sportspeople
20th-century African-American sportspeople